Peter Wynn Barkworth (14 January 1929 – 21 October 2006) was an English actor. He twice won the BAFTA TV Award for Best Actor; for Crown Matrimonial in 1975 and for Professional Foul and The Country Party in 1978. He also starred in the ITV series Manhunt (1970) and the BBC series Telford's Change (1979). His film appearances included Where Eagles Dare (1968), Patton (1970), International Velvet (1978) and Champions (1984).

Early life
Peter Barkworth was born 14 January 1929 at Margate, Kent. Soon after his birth, the family moved to Bramhall in Cheshire and Barkworth was educated at Stockport School. His headmaster wanted him to go to university but Barkworth had set his heart on a career in acting. In 1946 he won a scholarship to the Royal Academy of Dramatic Art (RADA). He spent the next few years in repertory in Folkestone, with the Arthur Brough company, and also in Sheffield. From the mid-1950s to the early 1960s he taught acting technique at RADA.

Acting career

Television and film appearances followed over four decades. He is perhaps best remembered for playing Mark Telford in the TV series Telford's Change (1979), watched every week by seven million viewers. This series followed the life of a senior banking executive as he downsized to Dover to start his life over again, leaving his wife in London. Barkworth co-starred with Hannah Gordon, with Keith Barron as her seducer.

Television
Barkworth twice won the BAFTA TV Award for Best Actor, in 1975 for Crown Matrimonial (1974) and in 1978 for his roles in Professional Foul and The Country Party (both 1977). His character in the 1965 boardroom drama The Power Game was a recurring role. He also appeared in the 1970s series ‘’The Rivals of Sherlock Holmes’’ as Martin Hewitt.

In 1967 he appeared in various episodes of The Avengers and also had a part in the Doctor Who serial The Ice Warriors as Leader Clent. From January until June 1970, he appeared in a leading role as Vincent in the World War II drama series Manhunt on LWT.  He featured in an episode of sci-fi drama Undermind (1965), and the dystopian The Guardians (1971), and starred in the mystery mini-series Melissa (1974) as an out of work writer whose wife goes missing. Barkworth also played the expatriate British novelist Hugh Neville in the episodes Guilt and Lost Sheep of Secret Army (1977). 

Later TV included the part of Stanley Baldwin in Winston Churchill: The Wilderness Years (1981), and the serials The Price (1985) and Late Starter (also 1985) in both of which he played angst-filled, middle-aged, middle class characters beset by marital problems in the context respectively of a kidnapping and the early retirement of an academic. Both these series and Telford's Change were based on Barkworth's original ideas. In 1988 Barkworth had a leading guest role in the fourth season Sherlock Holmes adaptation of the Arthur Conan Doyle story "Silver Blaze."  In one of his last roles, he starred opposite his former RADA student Michael Gambon in the 1993 episode "Maigret and the Minister" of ITV's Maigret series.

Theatre
Back on the stage, Barkworth appeared in numerous plays in the West End, notably as Edward VIII in Royce Ryton's Crown Matrimonial starring alongside Wendy Hiller at the Haymarket Theatre in 1972, a role which he repeated on TV two years later. He also devised a one-man show based on the work of Siegfried Sassoon.

Film
His film career began in 1959 with A Touch of Larceny. He had subsequent roles in No Love for Johnnie (1961), Two a Penny (1967), Where Eagles Dare (1968), Patton (1970), Escape from the Dark (1976), International Velvet (1978) and Champions (1983). His last appearance was in the film Wilde in 1997. He then retired from acting.

The arts
Barkworth was a member of the Council at RADA for 16 years during the 1980s and 1990s. His book About Acting – formerly titled The Complete About Acting – is often recommended reading for students and professional actors alike. He also edited For All Occasions: A Selection of Poems, Prose and Party Pieces (1997).
He was an avid collector of mainly British art. He left his collection of paintings to the National Trust and they are displayed at Fenton House in Hampstead. The works include two small Constables, several paintings by artists from the Camden Town Group, and many watercolours.

Personal life
Barkworth lived in Hampstead for many years, and died at the Royal Free Hospital in London of bronchopneumonia 10 days after suffering a stroke. He never married.

Testimonials
In The Sunday Times'', John Peter wrote: 

Stockport College has a theatre named after him.

Filmography

Film

Television

References

External links

Biography of Peter Barkworth Loose Cannon's Hall Of Fame
Brit actor Peter Barkworth dies BBC News, 25 October 2006

1929 births
2006 deaths
Alumni of RADA
Best Actor BAFTA Award (television) winners
Deaths from pneumonia in England
English male film actors
English male television actors
People from Margate
Actors from Stockport
Male actors from Kent